The Fiji national under-23 football team, also known as Fiji U23, represents Fiji at U23 tournaments. The team is considered to be the feeder team for the Fiji national football team.

History
Fiji U23 made the maximum of seven appearances so far at the OFC U23 Championship. Their best result was a first place in 2015. They participated at the 2016 Summer Olympics in Brazil for the first time, where they came in last place in their group and only scored one goal.

Tournament history

OFC 
The OFC Men's Olympic Qualifying Tournament is a tournament held once every four years to decide the only qualification spot for Oceania Football Confederation (OFC) and representatives at the Olympic Games.

Summer Olympic Games Record

Fixtures & Results

2019

Players

Current squad
The following players were called to the squad for the 2019 OFC Men's Olympic Qualifying Tournament from 21 September - 5 October 2019.
Caps and goals updated as of 5 October 2019 after the match against .

Recent call-ups

Overage players in Olympic Games

2016 Squad
The following players were called to the squad for the 2016 Summer Olympics from 4–20 August 2016.
Caps and goals updated as of 10 August 2016 after the match against .

Over-aged players

Technical staff

List of coaches
  Imdad Ali (2012)
  Frank Farina (2015-2016)
  Marika Rodu (2019)

References

under-23
Oceanian national under-23 association football teams